Gina B. Nahai (born 1961) is the author of Cry of the Peacock, Moonlight on the Avenue of Faith, Sunday's Silence and Caspian Rain. Her novels have been translated into more than a dozen languages. She was also a lecturer in the Master of Professional Writing (MPW) Program at the University of Southern California.

Early life and education 

Gina Barkhordar Nahai was born and grew up in Iran during the Shah's reign to a Persian Jewish family, and left with her family shortly before the country's revolution. At age 13, she began attending boarding school in Switzerland and later moved to the United States in 1977, arriving in Los Angeles the night Elvis Presley died. At the time, she did not realize she was leaving Iran for good. In college, she studied political science, including Iran's pre- and post-revolutionary politics, at the University of California, Los Angeles for both her bachelor's and master's of art degrees. Nahai speaks Persian, English, French, and Spanish.

Writing and career 

Nahai lives with her family in Los Angeles, where she formerly taught fiction writing at the University of Southern California's Master of Professional Writing program, where she also studied with John Rechy and earned her Master of Professional Writing degree. She previously taught at UCLA and worked at the RAND Corporation. She is a frequent lecturer on Iranian Jewish history and the topic of exile.

Nahai writes frequently for the Los Angeles-based Jewish Journal. She is currently working on a new novel, The Pearl Cannon.

Awards and honors 
Nahai and her writings have been nominated for and received numerous awards and honors. Following are some of the more prominent ones:
 2013: LA Press Club, Best Columnist (finalist)
 2008: Persian Heritage Award, first place
 2007: Caspian Rain nominated by MacAdam Cage Publishing for the National Book Award
 2007: Caspian Rain nominated by MacAdam Cage Publishing for the Pulitzer Prize
 2007: Caspian Rain selected as “One of the Best Books of the Year,” Chicago Tribune 
 2002: Simon Rockower Award (winner) 
 2001: Sunday's Silence selected as “One of the Best Books of the Year,” Los Angeles Times 
 2000: Orange Prize for Fiction (finalist)
 2000: International Dublin Literary Award (finalist)
 1999: Moonlight on the Avenue of Faith selected as “One of the Best Books of the Year,” Los Angeles Times 
 1992: Cry of the Peacock nominated by Crown Publishers for the Pulitzer Prize
 1985:  Nelson Algren Award, Chicago Magazine (honorable mention)

Bibliography 

Cry of the Peacock (1991) 
Moonlight on the Avenue of Faith (1999)
Sunday's Silence (2001)
"Mercy" (an essay in The Modern Jewish Girl's Guide to Guilt) (2006)
Caspian Rain (2007)
The Luminous Heart of Jonah S. (2014)

References

External links
 Official Site
 Facebook fan page
 Twitter
 "Spinning Jinni" May 30, 1999, New York Times

Writing teachers
University of Southern California faculty
Living people
20th-century American novelists
21st-century American novelists
American women novelists
1961 births
American writers of Iranian descent
Jewish American writers
20th-century American women writers
21st-century American women writers
American women academics
21st-century American Jews